Folketing elections were held in Denmark on 22 April 1918, the first in which women could vote. The result was a victory for Venstre, which won 45 of the 140 seats in the Folketing, which had been expanded from 114 to 140 seats. Voter turnout was 75.5%.

Electoral system
The Folketing was elected by a mixture of proportional representation in Copenhagen and first-past-the-post voting in single-member constituencies in the rest of the country. Outside of Copenhagen there were 20 regional levelling seats in addition to three national levelling seats, which were intended make the results more proportional.

The 1918 elections were the only ones in Danish history to feature this mixed system. Future elections would be entirely using proportional representation with the single-member districts not affecting the party-level results.

Results

References

Elections in Denmark
Denmark
Folketing election
Denmark